Trachydoras paraguayensis is a species of thorny catfish found in the Paraná River basin of Argentina, Bolivia, Brazil and Paraguay.  This species grows to a length of  SL.

References 
 

Doradidae
Catfish of South America
Fish of Argentina
Fish of Bolivia
Fish of Brazil
Fish of Paraguay
Fish described in 1907
Taxa named by Carl H. Eigenmann